Rhodopseudomonas parapalustris is a rod-shaped, budding phototrophic and motile bacterium from the genus of Rhodopseudomonas which has been isolated from soil and freshwater sediments in India.

References

External links
Type strain of Rhodopseudomonas parapalustris at BacDive -  the Bacterial Diversity Metadatabase

Further reading 
 

Nitrobacteraceae
Bacteria described in 2012